Nowa Góra ("new mountain") may refer to the following places in Poland:
 Nowa Góra, Lesser Poland Voivodeship (south Poland)
 Nowa Góra, Łódź Voivodeship (central Poland)
 Nowa Góra, Masovian Voivodeship (east-central Poland)
 Nowa Góra (mountain)